The list of rivers of the Great Basin identifies waterways named as rivers, regardless of the amount of their flow.



Significant rivers

The Great Basin is a series of contiguous watersheds, bounded on the west by watersheds of the Sacramento-San Joaquin and Klamath rivers, on the north by the watershed of the Columbia-Snake, and on the south and east by the watershed of the Colorado-Green rivers. The following are some of the most significant rivers in the Great Basin, most of which are in the states of Utah and Nevada.  While the longest rivers in the Great Basin are the Bear River (350 miles), Sevier River (385 miles), and Humbolt Rivers (290 miles). The meandering nature of the Humbolt River may make it as long as 390 miles.   
 Amargosa River – Death Valley (Nevada, California), 
 American Fork  – Utah Lake (Utah)
 Bear River – Great Salt Lake (Utah, Wyoming, Idaho), 
 Malad River (Idaho, Utah)
 Logan River (Utah)
 Little Bear River (Utah)
 Blacksmith Fork River (Utah)
 Chewaucan River – Lake Abert (Oregon), 
 Dairy Creek (Oregon)
 Elder Creek (Oregon)
 Bear Creek (Oregon)
 Carson River – Carson Sink (Nevada), 
 Donner und Blitzen River – Harney Basin (Oregon), 
 Little Blitzen River
 Humboldt River – Humboldt Sink (Nevada), 
 Little Humboldt River
 North Fork Humboldt River
 South Fork Humboldt River
 Reese River
 Jordan River – Great Salt Lake (Utah), 
 Mojave River – Mojave Desert (California), 
 Owens River – Owens Valley (California), 
 Provo River – Utah Lake (Utah), 
 Quinn River – Black Rock Desert (Nevada), 
 Kings River
Salton Sea
 New River
 Whitewater River
 Alamo River
 San Felipe Creek
 Sevier River – Sevier Lake (Utah), 
 East Fork Sevier River
 Beaver River
 San Pitch River
 Silvies River – Harney Basin (Oregon), 
 Susan River – Honey Lake (California), 
 Spanish Fork – Utah Lake (Utah), 
 Soldier Creek
 Thistle Creek
 Truckee River – Pyramid Lake (California, Nevada), 
 Walker River – Walker Lake (Nevada), 
 East Walker River
 West Walker River
 Little Walker River
 Weber River – Great Salt Lake (Utah), 
 Ogden River

See also
Landforms of the Great Basin
List of Great Basin watersheds
List of rivers of the Americas
 List of rivers of California
 List of rivers of Colorado
 List of rivers of Nevada
 List of rivers of Oregon
 List of rivers of Utah
 List of rivers of Wyoming

References

, GEOnet Names Server

.
Great Basin
Geography of the Western United States